Love That Girl! is an American sitcom that airs on TV One and debuted on January 19, 2010. The series started off as a four episode, on Friday, October 11, 2013

Series overview

Episodes

Season 1 (2010)

Season 2 (2011)
 Kendyl Joi is absent for one episode.
 Peter Oldring is absent for one episode.
 Mark Adair-Rios is absent for one episode.

Season 3 (2011-2012)
 This is Tatyana M. Ali & Kendyl Joi last season of the show.
 Alphonso McAuley is absent for two episodes.
 Bresha Webb is absent for one episode.
 Kendyl Joi is absent for one episode.
 Peter Oldring is absent for three episodes.
 Mark Adair-Rios is absent for eight episodes.

Season 4 (2013-2014)
 Tatyana M. Ali & Kendyl Joi no longer part of main cast.
 Reagan Gomez-Preston joins the cast.

Ratings

Season 1: 2010

Season 2: 2011

Season 3: 2011-2012

External links
 

Love That Girl